Gérson Fraga Vieira (born 4 October 1992), sometimes known as just Gérson, is a Brazilian professional footballer who plays as a defensive midfielder or defender for I-League club TRAU.

Club career
Born in Porto Alegre, Gérson Vieira joined the youth academy of Grêmio at the age of eight. On 17 January 2012, he was loaned out to Oeste for the Paulista championship. On 8 January 2013, during the preseason, he was promoted to the senior team. However, he failed to make a significant impact in the first team and soon speculation arose in the media of him joining French second-tier club Angers on a loan deal.

On 13 December 2013, Gérson Vieira was loaned out to Red Bull Brasil, for the 2014 Paulista A2. On 20 April, he scored his first goal for the club in a 3–2 victory against Rio Branco. On 28 July 2014, he moved abroad and joined Uruguyan club Atenas on a loan deal. Gerson joined Red Bull Brasil, again on loan on 10 July 2015.

Gérson Vieira switched clubs and countries and joined Indian Super League franchise Mumbai City on 28 June 2016. He went on to score for the franchise in a 3–2 semifinal defeat against ATK. After the season ended, he returned to his native country and joined Atlético Tubarão in January 2017. On 28 July, Mumbai City announced that they had retained Gerson for the 2017–18 season. He captained the team five times during the season, with manager Alexandre Guimarães describing him as a key player during the two seasons. After the season ended, he terminated his contract with the club and moved to Japanese second-tier club Renofa Yamaguchi on 20 March 2018.

On 30 July 2018, Gérson Vieira returned to India and joined ATK. On 10 November he scored his first goal for ATK from a header in the 82 minute of the match as ATK won against FC Pune City by 1–0.
On 25 June 2019 he joined Simba Sports Club which plays in Tanzania premier league as well as CAF Champions League.

In 2022, he returned to India and signed with I-League club TRAU and made his league debut on 15 November in their 1–1 draw against rival Aizawl.

International career
Gérson Vieira has been capped at the youth international level. He went on to win the Mediterranean International Cup with the under-15 and under-17 team and was also awarded the best player of the tournament of the 2009 Sendai Cup held at Japan. He has played for the under-17 team in the 2009 FIFA U-17 World Cup and went on to collect 14 caps for the side.

Club statistics

References

External links 

1992 births
Living people
Brazilian footballers
Brazilian expatriate footballers
Brazil youth international footballers
Indian Super League players
Grêmio Foot-Ball Porto Alegrense players
Atenas de San Carlos players
Oeste Futebol Clube players
Red Bull Brasil players
Expatriate footballers in Uruguay
Expatriate footballers in India
Mumbai City FC players
Renofa Yamaguchi FC players
J2 League players
Expatriate footballers in Japan
ATK (football club) players
Association football central defenders
Footballers from Porto Alegre